Nicholas Brown Jr. (April 4, 1769 – September 27, 1841) was an American businessman and philanthropist from Providence, Rhode Island, who was the namesake of Brown University.

Early life
Nicholas Brown Jr. was the son of Rhoda Jenckes (1741–1783) and Nicholas Brown Sr. (1729–1791), a merchant and co-founder of Brown University (which was then called College of Rhode Island and Providence Plantations). He was the nephew of John Brown (1736–1803) and Moses Brown (1738–1836) and a descendant of the English colonist and Baptist minister Chad Brown (c. 1600–1650), who co-founded Providence.  His maternal grandfather was Daniel Jenckes (1701–1774), a judge from a prominent family.

Career

Both Nicholas Brown Jr. and his father were members of and large donors to the First Baptist Church in America. Nicholas Brown Jr. graduated from the College of Rhode Island and Providence Plantations in 1786. After the death of his father, Brown created the company of Brown & Ives with his future brother-in-law, Thomas Poynton Ives, and served in the state legislature as a Federalist.

After inheriting his father's estate in 1791, Brown became such a great benefactor to the school that it was renamed Brown University for him in 1804 when he donated $5,000 to the college. His total gifts to the college totaled over $150,000. Brown also co-founded the Providence Athenaeum and was active in various Baptist and literary causes. He was elected a member of the American Antiquarian Society in 1813.

Personal life
He was married to Ann Carter (1770–1798), daughter of John Carter (1745–1814), a prominent printer in Providence. Together, they had:

 Nicholas Brown III (1792–1859), who married his 2nd cousin, Abby Mason (1800-1822), daughter of James Brown Mason (1775–1819), in 1820.  After her death, he married Caroline Matilda Cements (1809–1879) in 1831.
 Moses Brown (1793–1794), who died as an infant
 Anne Carter Brown (1794–1828), who married John Brown Francis (1791–1864), the grandson of her father's uncle, John Brown, in 1822.
 John Carter Brown II (1797–1874), who married Sophia Augusta Brown (1825–1909), daughter of Patrick Brown and Harriot Theyer, and a descendant of minister Roger Williams (1603–1683).

After his death September 27, 1841, Brown was interred in North Burial Ground in Providence. When Brown died in 1841 he left a $30,000 bequest to form a mental hospital, which eventually became known as Butler Hospital.

See also

Nightingale-Brown House

References

External links
 
 Encyclopedia Brunoniana - Brown Family

	

1769 births
1841 deaths
Brown University alumni
Brown University people
University and college founders
Rhode Island Federalists
Philanthropists from Rhode Island
Businesspeople from Providence, Rhode Island
Members of the American Antiquarian Society
19th-century American businesspeople
Baptists from Rhode Island
Nicholas Brown Jr.
Burials at North Burying Ground (Providence)
People of colonial Rhode Island